Monica Rho (born 25 October 1955) is a Costa Rican former professional tennis player.

She is the first Costa Rican female tennis player to compete in the Grand Slam.
She played in singles at the French Open in 1974. She lost to the Romanian player Judith Dibar-Gohn in the First Round.

In 1973 French Open, her partner in Women's Doubles, Japanese Naoko Sato lost in the Second  Round to the American Chris Evert and Soviet Olga Morozova.

Career finals

Singles (0–1)

Doubles: 3 (2–1)

References

1955 births
Living people
Costa Rican female tennis players